No Retreat, No Surrender: One American's Fight is a 2007 book by Tom DeLay and Stephen Mansfield. The book has a foreword by Rush Limbaugh and a preface by Sean Hannity.

Controversy
At least one statement about the Clinton administration included in the book — that the Clintons had sought to have military uniforms banned from the White House — had been repeatedly shown to be false prior to the publication of this book.

Quotes from the book
 On charges that DeLay violated campaign finance laws: "I believe it was Adolf Hitler who first acknowledged that the big lie is more effective than the little lie, because the big lie is so audacious, such an astonishing immorality, that people have a hard time believing anyone would say it if it wasn't true. You know, the big lie — like the Holocaust never happened or dark-skinned people are less intelligent than light-skinned people. Well, by charging this big lie liberals have finally joined the ranks of scoundrels like Hitler."

See also
 The Big Buy: Tom DeLay's Stolen Congress

References

External links
 No Retreat, No Surrender Official link
 Tom DeLay: 'No Retreat, No Surrender' NPR interview with DeLay
 Colbert Nails a Clueless Tom DeLay The Colbert Report interview with DeLay

2007 non-fiction books
Books about politics of the United States
Tom DeLay
Sentinel (publisher) books